Amartus is a genus of short-winged flower beetles in the family Kateretidae. There are at least three described species in Amartus.

Species
These three species belong to the genus Amartus:
 Amartus petrefactus Wickham, 1912
 Amartus rufipes LeConte, 1861
 Amartus tinctus (Mannerheim, 1843)

References

Further reading

 
 
 
 

Kateretidae
Articles created by Qbugbot